Campari Soda is a pre-mixed drink made by Campari for the Italian market. Campari Soda is Campari mixed with soda water (10% alcohol by volume). The distinctive bottle was designed by Fortunato Depero in 1932.

References

Alcoholic drinks